Alisina is a Cambrian genus of Obolellid brachiopod from which soft tissue (including pedicle) is known.

References

Brachiopod genera